The 1973 All-Ireland Under-21 Football Championship was the 10th staging of the All-Ireland Under-21 Football Championship since its establishment by the Gaelic Athletic Association in 1964.

Galway entered the championship as defending champions, however, they were defeated by Mayo in the Connacht final.

On 16 September 1973, Kerry won the championship following a 2-13 to 0-13 defeat of Mayo in the All-Ireland final. This was their second All-Ireland title overall and their first in nine championship seasons.

Results

All-Ireland Under-21 Football Championship

Semi-finals

Final

Statistics

Miscellaneous

 The All-Ireland semi-final between Kerry and Offaly is the first ever championship meeting between the two teams.

References

1973
All-Ireland Under-21 Football Championship